Chrysanthemum tea is a flower-based infusion beverage made from the chrysanthemum flowers of the species Chrysanthemum morifolium or Chrysanthemum indicum, which are most popular throughout East and Southeast Asia.

First cultivated in China as a herb as early as the 1500 BCE, Chrysanthemum became popularized as a tea during the Song Dynasty. In Chinese tradition, once a pot of chrysanthemum tea has been drunk, hot water is typically added again to the flowers in the pot (producing a tea that is slightly less strong); this process is often repeated several times.

To prepare the tea, chrysanthemum flowers (usually dried) are steeped in hot water (usually 90 to 95 degrees Celsius after cooling from a boil) in either a teapot, cup, or glass; often rock sugar or cane sugar is also added. The resulting drink is transparent and ranges from pale to bright yellow in color, with a floral aroma.

Varieties

China 
Several varieties of chrysanthemum, ranging from white to pale or bright yellow in color, are used for tea. These include:
Huángshān-gòngjú (literally "Yellow Mountain tribute chrysanthemum"); also called simply gòngjú
Hángbáijú, originating from Tongxiang, near Hangzhou; also called simply Hángjú,
Chújú, originating from the Chuzhou district of Anhui
Bójú, originating in the Bozhou district of Anhui
Of these, the first two are most popular. Some varieties feature a prominent yellow flower head while others do not.

Korea 
Gukhwacha is made from dried Indian chrysanthemum collected before fully opened.

 Chrysanthemum tea – The flowers are blanched in bamboo salt water, carefully washed in cold water and drained on kitchen towel. The drained flowers are covered with hanji and dried in an ondol (floor-heated) room. When served, three to four flowers are added to hot water.
 Honey chrysanthemum tea – The flowers are carefully washed and dried, then preserved in honey for three to four weeks. When served, the preserved flowers are added to hot water.
 Medicinal chrysanthemum tea – The flowers are washed carefully, steamed using the water mixed with herbal decoction and dried. When fully dried, they are steamed again, and dried again. This process is repeated nine times. Water to decoction ratio can be 8:1, and the decoction is usually made of dried roots of white woodland peony, steamed and dried roots of rehmannia, dried roots of Korean angelica, and dried roots of lovage.

Commercial availability
Although typically prepared at home, chrysanthemum tea is sold in many Asian restaurants (particularly Chinese), and in various Asian grocery stores in and outside Asia in canned or packed form, as either a whole flower or teabag presentation. Juice boxes of chrysanthemum tea may be sold.

Gallery

See also
 Chinese herb tea
 List of Chinese teas
 List of Chinese inventions
 Traditional Korean tea
 Xia Sang Ju

References

Asian cuisine
Asian drinks
Chinese teas
+Tea
Korean tea
Japanese tea
Malaysian cuisine
Malaysian tea
Singaporean cuisine
Flower tea
Tongxiang
East Asian cuisine
Southeast Asian cuisine